Progress in Neurobiology is a monthly peer-reviewed scientific journal covering all aspects of neuroscience, with an emphasis on multidisciplinary approaches. It was established in 1973 and is published by Elsevier. The editor-in-chief is Sabine Kastner (Princeton Neuroscience Institute, Princeton University).

Abstracting and indexing 
The journal is abstracted and indexed in:

According to the Journal Citation Reports, the journal has a 2017 impact factor of 14.163.

References

External links 
 

Monthly journals
Elsevier academic journals
Neuroscience journals
Publications established in 1973
English-language journals